Cyprus Today is the leading English-language newspaper in  North Cyprus. Founded on 12 October 1991, it is published weekly on Saturday and has a multi-national staff.  The newspaper contains up-to-date stories from North Cyprus as well as international news, entertainment and sport.

The newspaper's Editor in Chief is Eltan Halil and 
Managing Coordinator is Maria Djemal.

References

External links
 
Facebook Cyprus Today Online
Twitter cytodayonline
Instagram cyprustodayonline

1991 establishments in Cyprus
Publications established in 1991
English-language newspapers published in Europe
Weekly newspapers
Newspapers published in Northern Cyprus